The  is the head of government of Tokyo.

In 1943, upon the unification of Tokyo City and Tokyo Prefecture, the position of Governor was created. The current title was adopted in 1947 due to the enactment of the Local Autonomy Law.

Overview
The Governor of Tokyo is the head of the Tokyo Metropolitan Government, and is elected by the citizens of Tokyo Metropolis. The election is held every four years, the most recent one being the 2020 Tokyo gubernatorial election.

As Tokyo has the largest economy and population in the country, the Governor's policies can greatly affect national affairs, giving them significant influence in the country. This also gives the Governor's voice in the National Governors' Association more weight. The annual budget of Tokyo is about 13 trillion yen, 10 times more than other prefectures and comparable to the national budget of Indonesia. The Governor of Tokyo Metropolis is said to have a great deal of influence in the national economy as well. In addition, the Tokyo Metropolitan Government has more than 160,000 employees, making it by far the largest in the country.

Qualifications
Candidates must be a citizen of Japan and be a resident of Tokyo for more than three months, and must be over the age of 30. Candidates must also put up three million yen to the Tokyo Metropolitan Government, which will only be returned if they receive at least 10% of the votes.

List of governors of Tokyo Metropolis

Appointed governors of Tokyo Prefecture (1869–1943) 
Karasumaru Mitsue (1868)
Ōki Takatō (1868–1869)
Mibu Motoosa (1869–1871)
Yuri Kimimasa (1871–1872)
Ōkubo Ichiō (1872–1875)
Kusumoto Masataka (1875–1879)
Matsuda Michiyuki (1879–1882)
Yoshikawa Akimasa (1882–1885)
Watanabe Hiromoto (1885–1886)
Takasaki Goroku (1886–1890)
Marquis Hachisuka Mochiaki (1890–1891)
Tomita Tetsunosuke (1891–1893)
Miura Yasushi (1893–1896)
Marquis Koga Michitsune (1896–1897)
Viscount Okabe Nagamoto (1897–1898)
Koizuka Ryū (1898)
Baron Senge Takatomi (1898–1908)
Abe Hiroshi (governor)  (1908–1912, 1st time)
Abe Hiroshi (1919–1921, 2nd time)
Usami Katsuo (1921–1925)

Appointed governors of Tokyo Metropolis (1943–1947) 
Shigeo Ōdachi (1943–1944)
Toshizō Nishio (1944–1945)
Hisatada Hirose (1945–1946)
Shōhei Fujinuma (1946)
Haruo Matsui (1946)
Seiichirō Yasui (1946–1947)
Kazumi Iinuma (1947)

Elected governors of Tokyo Metropolis (1947–present) 
 Seiichiro Yasui (1947–1959)
 Ryotaro Azuma (1959–1967)
 Ryokichi Minobe (1967–1979)
 Shunichi Suzuki (1979–1995)
 Yukio Aoshima (1995–1999)
 Shintaro Ishihara (1999–2012)
 Naoki Inose (2012–2013)
 Yōichi Masuzoe (2014–2016)
 Yuriko Koike (2016–present)

References

Politics of Japan
Politics of Tokyo
 
Tokyo Metropolis
Tokyo Metropolis